R8C Tiny is series of low-cost microcontrollers from Renesas. Having 16-bit CPU core M16C with 8-bit bus, the R8C Tiny series offer wide variety of on-chip peripherals include 8-bit Multifunction Timers, UART/Clock Synchronous Serial Interface, Input Capture Timer, Watchdog Timer, etc.

External links 
Renesas R8C Tiny homepage

Renesas microcontrollers